Davis Anchorage is an anchorage in Antarctica about  in extent with general depths of , lying off Breidnes Peninsula, Vestfold Hills. The anchorage has been used by Australian National Antarctic Research Expeditions ships to Davis Station, for which it is named, since 1957.

References

See also
Anchorage Patch

Bays of Princess Elizabeth Land
Ingrid Christensen Coast